Francis Cooke may refer to:
Francis Cooke (c. 1583–1663), Mayflower passenger
Francis Judd Cooke (1910–1995), American composer and musician
Francis Cooke, Sheriff of Nottingham 1654/55
Francis Cooke (judge) KC (born 1965), judge at the High Court of New Zealand

See also 
Frank Cooke (disambiguation)
Francis Cook (disambiguation)